Quepos is a district of the canton of Quepos, in the province of Puntarenas, Costa Rica.

Toponymy
The town is named for the native Quepo Indians who inhabited the place in the colonial era.

History
The area was home to the native Quepoa people of this specific Costa Rican region. In 1563, Spanish Catholic conquistadores, led by Juan Vázquez de Coronado, settled the area and founded the settlement of San Bernardino de Quepo. The local native Quepo people were then subsequently subjugated by Juan Vázquez and his conquistadores.

In 1746, the Quepo people that remained were transferred to a reservation which already contained another native ethnic group. 
Quepos offers fishing for numerous varieties of fish, especially Pacific Sailfish.  Peak fishing season is from November to April for billfish.

Geography 
Quepos has an area of  km² and an elevation of  metres.

The town is about 60 km. south (in a straight line) from Costa Rica's capital, San José, but is 157 km from that city by road if going through the localities of Atenas, Orotina and Tárcoles.

Villages
Administrative center of the district is the town of Quepos.

Other villages are Anita, Bartolo, Boca Naranjo, Cañas, Cañitas, Cerritos, Cerros, Damas, Delicias, Espadilla, Estero Damas, Estero Garita, Llamarón, Llorona, Managua, Manuel Antonio, Marítima, Mona, Papaturro, Paquita, Pastora, Quebrada Azul, Rey, Ríos and Roncador.

Demographics 

For the 2011 census, Quepos had a population of  inhabitants.

Transportation

Road transportation 
The district is covered by the following road routes:
 National Route 34
 National Route 235
 National Route 616
 National Route 618

Economy

Quepos is the gateway to Manuel Antonio National Park. The city is very tourism-oriented, having many bars and restaurants and a vivacious night-life.
Quepos is well known thanks to being the gateway to a popular National Park and beaches in Costa Rica. Several years ago the country's park service imposed limits on the number of visitors to the park (600 per day, and it is closed on Mondays).

Climate
Quepos has a tropical monsoon climate (Am) with moderate to little rainfall from January to March and heavy to very heavy rainfall in the remaining months.

References

External links

Districts of Puntarenas Province
Populated places in Puntarenas Province